Hulsea mexicana, the Mexican alpinegold or Mexican hulsea is a rare North American species of flowering plant in the family Asteraceae.

It has been found only in a small region straddling the border between Mexico and the United States. It grows in northern Baja California and in southern California (Imperial County and San Diego County). The first botanical specimens collected were from the Mexican side of the border.

Description
Hulsea mexicana is an annuals or biennial herb sometimes reaching  in height. Most of the leaves are on the stem rather than clustered around the base. One plant will generally produce 3–5 flower heads, each with 20–35 ray flowers surrounding a large number of tiny disc flowers.

References

External links
Jepson Manual Treatment — Hulsea mexicana, University of California
/United States Department of Agriculture Plants Profile: Hulsea mexicana
Hulsea mexicana — Calphotos Photo gallery, University of California

mexicana
Flora of California
Flora of Baja California
Plants described in 1914
Flora without expected TNC conservation status